The cycling competitions at the 2013 Mediterranean Games in Mersin took place between 21 June and 23 June at the Adnan Menderes Boulevard. Women's road race was planned, but got cancelled because too few nations applied.

Athletes competed in two events.

Medal summary

Road cycling

Medal table
Key:

References

 
Sports at the 2013 Mediterranean Games
2013
2013 in road cycling
2013 in men's road cycling